Lee Yong-chul (born January 4, 1970) is a South Korean sprint canoer who competed in the late 1980s and early 1990s. At the 1988 Summer Olympics in Seoul, he was eliminated in the repechages of the K-4 1000 m event. Four years later in Barcelona, Lee was eliminated in the first round of the same event.

External links
Sports-reference.com profile

1970 births
Canoeists at the 1988 Summer Olympics
Canoeists at the 1992 Summer Olympics
Living people
Olympic canoeists of South Korea
South Korean male canoeists
Asian Games medalists in canoeing
Canoeists at the 1990 Asian Games
Korea National Sport University alumni
Medalists at the 1990 Asian Games
Asian Games silver medalists for South Korea